Arthur Perry may refer to:

 Arthur Perry (cricketer) (1840-1898), New Zealand cricketer
 Arthur Latham Perry (1830–1905), American economist
 Arthur Edgar Perry (1864–1925), organist and composer
 Art Perry (born 1946), American college basketball coach